Antindra is a municipality in northern Madagascar. It belongs to the district of Sambava, which is a part of Sava Region. The population of the commune was estimated to be approximately 16,000 in 2001 commune census.

Only primary schooling is available in town. The majority 98% of the population in the commune are farmers.  The most important crops are rice and vanilla, while other important agricultural products are coffee and sugarcane.  Services provide employment for 2% of the population.

References

Populated places in Sava Region